Edbaye El Hejaj is a village and rural commune in the Brakna Region of southern Mauritania.

In 2000, the village had a population of 6,958.

References

Communes of Brakna Region